Actions per minute, abbreviated to APM, is a term used in video games, particularly real-time strategy and fighting games  which refers to the total number of actions that a player can perform in a minute. 
Actions per minute are the number of actions (such as selecting units or issuing an order) completed within a minute of gameplay in real-time strategy games, most notably in StarCraft. High APM is often associated with skill, as it can indicate that a player both knows what to do in the game and has the manual dexterity to carry it out. Software has been developed to analyze players' APM in these games. Beginners often have low APM counts, typically below 50. Professional e-athletes in South Korea usually have average APM scores around 350, but often exceed the 450 mark during intense battle sequences. Notable gamers with over 400 average APM include Lee Jae-Dong. Park Sung-Joon is noted for the record APM of 818.
However, given that the majority of APMs are repetitions of orders already given, APM is not always considered an accurate indication of skill.

Origin 
The term APM originates from StarCraft, and was popularised after the development of a large number of community tools allowing observers of game matches to view player resources and "actions per minute", which was used as a metric in determining a player's skill. After the release of StarCraft II: Wings of Liberty, many of these metrics were built into the game's interface, including APM, which further popularised the term's usage and served to increase the competitiveness of the game.

Speed and efficiency in APM 
A player's APM value is determined by the number of actions performed in a given minute. Some actions, such as repeated selection, are easier to carry out than others, and players may repeatedly perform (or "spam") these actions, making them redundant in terms of their usefulness. "Spamming" may be used as a way to warm up and maintain speed for later phases of the game, or it may be used simply to increase a player's recorded APM in order to improve the perception of their gameplay skills. Because of this, more sophisticated measures of APM may attempt to filter out redundant actions by means such as ignoring re-selection of a group of units which was already selected and ignoring the very beginning of the game (when the typical relative lack of action facilitates spamming), in order to only measure a player's "efficient/effective" APM value. However, there is currently no standardization of what constitutes an "effective action" and APM is therefore typically recorded without any filtering.

Accuracy in APM 
Accuracy is another factor related to a player's APM.  Accuracy is the coordination of precise mouse clicks and keystrokes.  Greater accuracy will result in fewer mis-clicks and mis-strokes; thus the player's efficiency increases with greater accuracy, meaning the APM is a more accurate measurement statistic.

References 

Units of frequency